Major General Ian Stewart Harrison  (1919 – 2 April 2008) was a senior Royal Marines officer who served as Captain of Deal Castle from 1980 to 2009 before the positions abolition. Harrison was commissioned into the Royal Marines in 1937, and commanded 40 Commando from 1959 to 1961.

External links
https://web.archive.org/web/20080428032027/http://www.specialoperations.com/Focus/Official/Commanders/default.html

1919 births
2008 deaths
Captains of Deal Castle
Companions of the Order of the Bath
Royal Marines generals
Royal Marines personnel of World War II